Estadio Municipal de Los Ángeles is a multi-use stadium in Los Ángeles, Chile.  It is used mostly for football matches and is the home stadium of Deportes Iberia. The stadium holds 4,150 people.

External links

Sports venues in Biobío Region
Football venues in Chile
Los Ángeles, Chile